Suhaili is the name of the  Bermudan ketch sailed by Sir Robin Knox-Johnston in the first non-stop solo circumnavigation of the world in the Sunday Times Golden Globe Race.

Design and Construction

Suhaili was built in Bombay with the help of Royal Bombay Yacht Club, India in 1963. She follows plans designed by William Atkin for "Eric" in 1923. Her design is based on the Norwegian sailing lifeboat designs of Colin Archer.

Notable Appearances

In 1997 Suhaili went to the National Maritime Museum at Falmouth as an exhibit, but the controlled atmosphere began to shrink her planking, and, unwilling to see her die this way, Sir Robin Knox-Johnston removed her in 2002 and re-fitted her again. She still belongs to Knox-Johnston and is currently being slowly re-fastened at the Elephant Boatyard at Bursledon, near Southampton, UK with the objective of getting her back into commission.

Suhaili was one of a number of prestigious vessels moored along the route of the Thames Diamond Jubilee Pageant, to celebrate the diamond jubilee of Queen Elizabeth II. Due to her size, she was not part of the flotilla, and was instead moored with other vessels at St Katharine Docks, in a display known as the Avenue of Sail.

External links
 http://www.robinknox-johnston.co.uk/da/20076
 https://www.robinknox-johnston.co.uk/boats/

References

Sailing ships
1960s sailing yachts
Sailing yachts built in India
Sailboat type designs by William Atkin